The Sea Girl is a children's book written by Sophia de Mello Breyner Andresen.

Plot
There is a country that is land and a country that is the sea. A young boy falls in love with a girl. He comes from the earth, she from the sea. What is the land? What is the sea? Each explains the universe to the other. But what will they do to come together?

Children's novels
1958 novels
20th-century Portuguese novels
1958 children's books
Portuguese children's literature